{{DISPLAYTITLE:C20H19NO3}}
The molecular formula C20H19NO3 (molar mass: 321.37 g/mol, exact mass: 321.1365 u) may refer to:

 Acronine
 Pyriproxyfen

Molecular formulas